Jill Feldman (born 21 April 1952 in Los Angeles) is an American soprano who has acquired an international reputation  for her interpretation of medieval, baroque and classical repertoires.

Her highly expressive singing art combines great vocal agility with a profound dramatic sense of drama, in constant respect for the text.

Training 
Feldman obtained her musical diploma at the University of California at Santa Barbara.

Career 
As soon as she finished her studies, Jill Feldman took part successively in three prestigious productions: she appeared as La Musica in a production of Monteverdi's l'Orfeo, directed by Philip Brett at Berkeley in California, as Clerio in Cavalli's Erismena at Spoleto (Italy), and played a role in Ordo Virtutum by Hildegard von Bingen during a tour of the ensemble "Sequentia".

In 1981, at the request of her countryman William Christie, she joined in Paris the baroque ensemble Les Arts Florissants which then was the spearhead of the "baroqueux" movement. With this famous ensemble, she played the title role of Charpentier's Médée. Its recording for the label Harmonia Mundi won the Gramophone Classical Music Awards in 1985, also the Prize of the Académie Charles Cros and the Grand Prix du Disque de Montreux. Afterwards, Feldman recorded two discs with the Philharmonia Baroque Orchestra under the direction of Nicholas McGegan in works by Handel,  the cantata Clori, Tirsi e Fileno, and the oratorio Susanna  (Harmonia Mundi USA). Later, she joined the Mala Punica medieval ensemble, with which she recorded five projects for Arcana and Erato.

Feldman was then invited by several conductors of the baroque repertoire. She performed under the direction of Frans Brüggen (Haydn's Die Schöpfung), Andrew Parrott (Les Vêpres des Carmélites by Handel at EMI), Jordi Savall (Motets by Delalande), René Jacobs (Cesti's Orontea and Cavalli's Xerse at Harmonia Mundi). She played the role of Armida in Alessandro Stradella's Lo Schiavo Liberato at the Théâtre de Modène and the Festival of Liège, as well as the title role in La Vita Humana by Marazzoli at the Tramway of Glasgow. In the field of contemporary music, she performed at the Villa Medici in Rome, the Church of Santa Maria della Grazia in Milan, and the Ysbreker Festival in Amsterdam.

Teaching 
Feldman has been teaching at the Royal Conservatory of The Hague in the Netherlands, at the Music and Theatre College in Zurich, and at the Amici della Musica in Florence and the Accademia di musiga antiga of Portugal. She gives master classes all over Europe, the United States, Japan and South Korea.

Discography

With Les Arts Florissants 
 1981 
 H.483 by Marc-Antoine Charpentier
 Les surprises de l'Amour by Jean-Philippe Rameau
 1982 
 (In Nativitatem D.N.J.C. Canticum) H.414 by Charpentier
 Oratorios (Un peccator pentito, O Cecità del misero mortale) by Luigi Rossi
 Les Arts Florissants H.487 by Charpentier
 Antienne "O" de l'Avent by Charpentier
 1983
 In Nativitatem Domini Canticum H.416 by Charpentier
  H.482 by Charpentier
 1984 
Médée by Charpentier
 Airs de cour (1689) by Michel Lambert
 1986: Dido and Aeneas by Purcell (Belinda)
 1986: Cantates françaises (Arion, La Dispute de l'Amour et de l'Hymen, Les Femmes, Enée et Didon) by André Campra
 1987: Selva morale e spirituale by Monteverdi
 1989:  by Rossi

Other recordings 
 1983: Motets by François Couperin, with Isabelle Poulenard, Gregory Reinhart, Davitt Moroney, Jaap Ter Linden
 1988: Œuvres pour le Port-Royal by Charpentier, with Greta De Reyghere, Isabelle Poulenard, Bernard Foccroulle and the Ricercar Consort
1991: Udite Amanti: 17th Century Italian Love Songs, with Nigel North (theorbo and archlute)
 1992: Orpheus Britannicus (Ayres & Songs) by Purcell, with Nigel North (archlute) and Sarah Cunningham (viol)
 1994: Ars Subtilis Ytalica, with Mala Punica
 1995: D'Amor ragionando, Ballades du neo-Stilnovo en Italie, 1380-1415, with Mala Punica
 1996: En attendant. L'art de la citation dans l'Italie des Visconti, 1380-1410, with Mala Punica
 1997: Missa cantilena, Contrafactures liturgiques en Italie, 1380-1410, with Mala Punica
 1999: Hélas Avril. Les chansons de Matteo da Perugia, with Mala Punica
 2001: Harmonia Sacra; Complete Organ Music by Purcell, with Davitt Moroney (organ)
 2002: Pianger Di Dolcezza, vocal works by Giulio Caccini and Sigismondo d'India, with Karl-Ernst Schröder (chitarrone) and Mara Galassi (harp)
 2003: Monografia, compositions by Kees Boeke
 2003: Trecento, with Kees Boeke (flustes and vielle)
 2004: Musiche sacre e morali by Domenico Mazzocchi, with Orlanda Velez Isidro (soprano) and Kenneth Weiss (chromatic harpsichord and organ)
 2004: Ténèbres by Charpentier, François Couperin and Michel-Richard de Lalande, with Kenneth Weiss (harpsichord) and Rainer Zipperling (viol)
 2005: Consort Songs by William Byrd and His Contemporaries, with the ensemble Concerto delle Viole, 
 2006: Guillaume Dufay, Chansons, with the Ensemble Tetraktys.
 2007: Songs by Charles Ives, with Jeannette Koekkoek (piano)
 2008: Codex Chantilly Vol. 1, with the Ensemble Tetraktys

Operatic roles 
 Médée by Marc-Antoine Charpentier (title role)
 La Musica and Proserpina in l'Orfeo by Monteverdi
 Minerva in Il ritorno d'Ulisse in patria by Monteverdi
 The great priestess in Anacréon by Jean-Philippe Rameau
 La vita umana by Marco Marazzoli (title role)
 Adelanta in Xerse by Cavalli
 Clerio in l'Erismena by Cavalli
 Armida in Lo Schiavo liberato by Alessandro Stradella
 Belinda in Dido and Aeneas by Purcell
 Donna Anna in Don Giovanni by Mozart
 Silvia in Ascanio in Alba by Mozart
 Arthébuze in Actéon by Charpentier
 The aunt in Mariken in de tuin der Lusten by Calliope Tsoupaki

References

External links 
 Website of Jill Feldman and Kees Boeke (Olive Music) 
 Website of the Les Arts Florissants ensemble
 Jill Feldman biography on AllMusic
 Jill Feldman on data.bnf.fr
 Jill Feldman on Classiquenews.com
 Jill Feldman's discography on Discogs
 Jill Feldman, Isabelle Poulenard, F. Couperin Motet Jucunda vox ecclasiae on YouTube

American operatic sopranos
American music educators
1952 births
Living people
Singers from Los Angeles
Women music educators
American performers of early music
Women performers of early music
20th-century American women  opera singers
21st-century American women opera  singers